In mathematics, a multiplicative sequence or m-sequence is a sequence of polynomials associated with a formal group structure.  They have application in the cobordism ring in algebraic topology.

Definition
Let Kn be polynomials over a ring A in indeterminates p1, ... weighted so that pi has weight i (with p0 = 1) and all the terms in Kn have weight n (in particular Kn is a polynomial in p1, ..., pn).  The sequence Kn is multiplicative if the map

is an endomorphism of the multiplicative monoid , where .

The power series

is the characteristic power series of the Kn.  A multiplicative sequence is determined by its characteristic power series Q(z), and every power series with constant term 1 gives rise to a multiplicative sequence.

To recover a multiplicative sequence from a characteristic power series Q(z) we consider the coefficient of z j in the product

for any m > j.  This is symmetric in the βi and homogeneous of weight j: so can be expressed as a polynomial Kj(p1, ..., pj) in the elementary symmetric functions p of the β.  Then Kj defines a multiplicative sequence.

Examples
As an example, the sequence Kn = pn is multiplicative and has characteristic power series 1 + z.

Consider the power series

where Bk is the k-th Bernoulli number.  The multiplicative sequence with Q as characteristic power series is denoted Lj(p1, ..., pj).

The multiplicative sequence with characteristic power series

is denoted Aj(p1,...,pj).

The multiplicative sequence with characteristic power series

is denoted Tj(p1,...,pj): these are the Todd polynomials.

Genus

The genus of a multiplicative sequence is  a ring homomorphism, from the  cobordism ring of smooth oriented compact manifolds to another ring, usually the ring of rational numbers.

For example, the Todd genus is associated to the Todd polynomials with characteristic power series .

References
 

Polynomials
Topological methods of algebraic geometry